Layout boat hunting is a sub specialty of traditional waterfowl hunting which is done in a low-profile un-motorized boat made of a unique design to allow hunter to maintain a close position to the water in order to conceal them in open water areas that are frequented by diver and ocean ducks. This is a sport with a long history going back to market hunters and boat-mounted punt guns. The main focus of the layout boat is to put the hunter very close to the decoys, or even among them, for additional concealment. This makes for dramatic hunting scenarios where a decoying bird comes extremely close to the hunter and boat.

Most layout boats are used for diver duck or ocean duck hunting where an open deep water waterfowl species frequent. Sometimes they are deployed in marshes for more traditional puddle duck hunting or goose hunting.

Hunting
Open water layout boat hunters are known for operating on the riskier side of waterfowl hunting due to hunting on large areas of water such as the Great Lakes and oceans. They are known to target diving diver ducks such as bluebills (greater scaup), canvasback, goldeneye, scoter and eider to name a few.

Layout hunters usually deploy large spreads of diver ducks in open water areas. Many successful patterns have been created for these spreads over the years. Some layout hunters will use as many as 300 decoys or more.  Layout boats are commonly called "rigs" because the usually require a larger tender boat to do the work of setting up a decoy spread, changing hunter and retrieving downed bird. Tender boats also play a much more important role of watchdog should anything go wrong. Every rig has its own system for setting and retrieving decoys. Some hunters employee long main lines (also called mother lines) with 10 to 20 decoys attached to a single line via short snap ropes. Other hunters use single line decoys with no main line at all. All these methods are effective.

Layout boats are positioned very close or inside the decoy spread, making it harder for waterfowl to distinguish the boat, and the hunters lay back flat into the boat hiding themselves from the birds. Many times this done on a rotation basis with other hunters working the tender boat. Small layout boats can weather some very rough water which adds the element of danger to the sport.

Designs

Layout boats come in designs such as pumpkin seed, oval, box-like. They come in one- and two-man models.

References

Further reading
Sternberg, Dick and Simpson, Jeff (1997). The Complete Hunter: Duck Hunting 
Smith, Nick (2006). Waterfowl Hunting: Ducks and Geese of North America
Kramer, Gary (2003). A Ducks Unlimited Guide to Hunting Diving & Sea Ducks
DeVore, Michael (2013). Lake Saint Clair Sportsman
Airhar, Tom; Kent, Eddie; Raymer, Kent (2017). The Ultimate Guide to Waterfowl Hunting

Bird hunting
Boat types